Jaroslav Radil is a former Czechoslovak slalom canoeist who competed in the 1970s. He won four medals at the ICF Canoe Slalom World Championships with two golds (C-1 team: 1973, 1975), a silver (C-1: 1975) and a bronze (C-1 team: 1977).

References

Czechoslovak male canoeists
Possibly living people
Year of birth missing (living people)
Medalists at the ICF Canoe Slalom World Championships